Ustaad may refer to:
 Ustaad (1999 film), an Indian Malayalam-language action film
 Ustaad (1989 film), a Bollywood film